Sagar Port is a proposed seaport in Sagar Island, West Bengal, India by Government of India  and Government of West Bengal.IIT Madras has been engaged to prepare a detailed project report (DPR) for the port, involving studies for shore-protection, land reclamation and physical modeling for use of dredge material. Cost of the port build up ₹30 billion. The port is scheduled to have an initial capacity to handle 60 mn tonne of bulk and containerised cargo. A rail cum road bridge over the Muriganga river is proposed to connect the Sagar Island to the mainland via Kakdwip. The length of rail-road bridge is 3.3km .

The reason for the construction 
Due to the decrease in navigability of the port of Kolkata, Haldia port has reduced the exports of the port. The reason for this is that a 10.5-meter depth port is being constructed in the Sagardwip in West Bengal, where the depth of the Calcutta Port is 6 meters (20 ft) and the depth of the port of Haldia is 8 meters (26 ft).

Monetary approval 
The central government has sanctioned 5.15 billion rupees to make the proposed Sea Port project potentially financially. The approval of the government for the development of this port has been continuously being undertaken by the Union Shipping Ministry for the past two years. This project has been added to implement Bhore Sea Port Limited (BSPL). The Kolkata Port Trust and the West Bengal Government's share in the implementation of the entire project will be 74 percent and 26 percent respectively. Work has been done to increase connectivity and communication with the port. Construction of a road and rail bridge to connect the island of Sagar with the mainland has been proposed, Muriganga bridge over the Muriganga River.
Ganges bridge over the conglomerate of the river Ganges.

Detailed Project Report on National Highways and Infrastructure Development Corporation (NHIBL L) has been prepared on the basis of construction of roads and railways. The cost of construction of the bridge will be 18.22 billion.  The work of connecting this road and rail bridge with the national highways and rail network has started in full swing. Under the scheme, the National Road Transport and Highways Department has agreed to convert the National Highway Number 117 to a four-lane road. This four-lane road will be expanded from Kakdeep to Joka, from the Sagardwip railway to the road bridge. The Railway Board has approved the necessary surveys to connect this port to the mainland railway network.

References

External links

Ports and harbours of West Bengal
Proposed ports in India